Pyrgospira candace is a species of sea snail, a marine gastropod mollusk in the family Pseudomelatomidae, the turrids and allies.

Description
The size of the shell attains 7.5 mm, its diameter 3.5 mm.

(Original description) The small shell is pale purple with touches of brown.  The protoconch is lost. The shell contains  about seven subsequent short whorls. The suture is appressed, obscure, behind a moderately impressed anal fasciole with a fine thread between them. The other spiral sculpture consists of (on the spire) two peripheral close-set threads overriding the ribs. In front of these on the body whorl are two or three obscure broad flattish ridges with rather wide interspaces overridden by the axial sculpture, and on the siphonal canal a few rather sharp threads more closely set. The axial sculpture consists of 10 or more short ribs on the penultimate whorl with narrower interspaces. On the body whorl there are about 13 smaller ribs extending nearly to the siphonal canal and reticulating the spiral sculpture. The incremental lines are rather marked. The aperture is wide and short. The anal sulcus is large, rounded and shows a subsutural callus. The outer lip is thin-edged, prominent, with a large rounded varix behind it. Within it is dark brow and smooth. The 
inner lip is simple. The columella is very short and not callous. The siphonal canal is very short but distinct.

Distribution
This species occurs in the Caribbean Sea and off the Lesser Antilles; in the Gulf of California, Western Mexico

References

External links
 
 
 MNHN: specimen
 De Jong K.M. & Coomans H.E. (1988) Marine gastropods from Curaçao, Aruba and Bonaire. Leiden: E.J. Brill. 261 pp. 

candace
Gastropods described in 1919